Myrtle Edwards (7 June 192130 August 2010) was an Australian softball and cricket player.

Edwards was born in Clifton Hill, Victoria. In 1949, she was named the captain of the first Australian Open Women's Team to play a test
series against New Zealand. She coached in four Women's World Championships from 1965–1978, winning
gold at the inaugural 1965 ISF Women's World Championships in Melbourne. For her contribution to the sport she was inducted into both the Softball Australia and the ISF Halls of Fame, as well as becoming a Life Member of Softball Victoria.

Edwards also played one Test match for Australia against New Zealand in 1948.

Edwards died on 30 August 2010.

References

1921 births
2010 deaths
Australia women Test cricketers
Australian softball players
Sportswomen from Victoria (Australia)
People from Clifton Hill, Victoria
Cricketers from Melbourne